Mark Beard may refer to:
 Mark Beard (footballer) (born 1974), former English football defender
 Mark Beard (artist) (born 1956), American artist
 Mark Beard (racing driver) (1948–2021), American race car driver and team owner